Ghost is a 1984 Japanese experimental short film directed by Takashi Ito. As with Ito's shorts Thunder (1982) and Grim (1984), Ghost was shot in 16 mm, features long-exposure photography, and has been characterized as using light, sound, and photographic techniques to create an ominous atmosphere and invoke the feeling of a space haunted by a ghostly presence.

Synopsis
Ghost depicts spaces in and around an apartment building, utilizing frame-by-frame long-exposure photography. A figure holding a flashlight is sometimes seen, with the beam of the flashlight appearing as a trail of light due to the long exposure; the figure itself appears weightless and fleeting.

According to Ito:
I made [Ghost] because I wanted to try out the idea of floating images in midair that had come to me when making Thunder. The entire work was shot frame-by-frame with long exposures. I filmed this in the company dorm I was living in, in the middle of the night after I had come home from work, and thought I might die from what had become my daily pattern of sleeping for two hours in the morning then going off to work.

Release
Ghost screened on 24 September 1985 at RMIT University's Glasshouse Cinema at RMIT University in Melbourne, Australia, as part of "Continuum", a program of "Japanese alternative cinema made in 1984." It was later released on DVD along with a number of Ito's other works as part of the Takashi Ito Film Anthology.

References

External links
 

1984 films
1984 short films
1980s Japanese films
1980s avant-garde and experimental films
Japanese avant-garde and experimental films
Japanese short films
Films shot in 16 mm film